Anti-Communist Hero was the title given by the Republic of China government in Taiwan to defectors from People's Republic of China during the Korean War and the Cold War. The title was first given on 23 January 1954 to 14,000 prisoners of war from the People's Volunteer Army who defected to Taiwan. Most of them were former Kuomintang soldiers taken captive by the communist forces during the Chinese Civil War. The defectors were tattooed with anti-communist slogans and the Taiwanese flag before coming to Taiwan. The memorial day World Freedom Day (一二三自由日) was founded in their honor.

The title was later given to a number of PLAAF defectors who also surrendered their aircraft, providing valuable insight into PRC aircraft technology. Many of these defectors were given financial rewards. The title was abolished following the end of martial law in Taiwan and the thawing of cross-strait relations.

References

Further reading
戰後外交史料彙編：韓戰與反共義士篇（一）：2005，行政院原住民委員會，

Military history of Taiwan
Political history of Taiwan
Taiwan under Republic of China rule
Cross-Strait relations
Chinese defectors